Heartache City is the sixth studio album by American musical group CocoRosie. It was released by CocoRosie's own record label, Lost Girl Records, on September 18, 2015. The album is described by music webzine The Line of Best Fit as a freak folk album in which "the tracks all share a strong backbone of hip hop and afro-beat".

Background

Promotion and release
On June 11, 2015, CocoRosie shared a behind-the-scenes video of the group in the studio and announced that a new album would be released that Fall. The video featured snippets of the tracks "Hairnet Paradise" and "Big and Black", the latter being intended for the album. The album was preceded by the release of three live recordings of album tracks: "Heartache City" on July 9, 2015; "Un Beso" on July 22, 2015; and "Lost Girls" on August 11, 2015. The live tracks were recorded at Findspire Studio and released on SoundCloud. The album's title and release date were revealed along with the release of "Un Beso (Live)" on July 22, 2015. On September 10, 2015, the track "Tim and Tina" premiered exclusively through Billboard.

Heartache City was released digitally on September 18, 2015 and on CD on October 16, 2015. It is the first album to be released on CocoRosie's own label, Lost Girl Records. The non-album track "Lilies of Innocence" which features guest vocals from frequent collaborator Anohni was available to download upon ordering the album on CD from CocoRosie's website. On January 29, 2016, the album was released on vinyl. The vinyl release has different album art and includes two bonus tracks: "Lilies of Innocence" and "Un Beso (Live)".

Critical reception

At Metacritic, which assigns a weighted average score out of 100 to reviews from mainstream critics, the album received an average score of 66, based on 7 reviews, indicating "generally favorable reviews".

Track listing

Personnel
Credits adapted from liner notes.

 CocoRosie – performance, production
 Tez – human beatbox (4), production (4)
 Takuya Nakamura – keyboards (4, 8), trumpet (4, 8)
 Tavahn Ghazi – vocals (6)
 Nicolas Kalwill – engineering, mixing

Charts

References

External links
 

2015 albums
CocoRosie albums